Organ Grinder Swing is a 1965 studio album by Jimmy Smith. It marked a return to the trio ensemble that Smith used on the Blue Note recordings earlier in his career.

Reception
AllMusic's Scott Yanow stated: 

The album was the second highest charting album of Smith's career, reaching a chart position of number 15 on the US Billboard 200 charts. It was on the charts for 31 weeks.

Track listing
"Organ Grinder's Swing" (Will Hudson, Irving Mills, Mitchell Parish) – 2:16
"Oh No, Babe" (Jimmy Smith) – 9:02
"Blues for J" (Smith) – 5:19
"Greensleeves" (Traditional) – 8:54
"I'll Close My Eyes" (Buddy Kaye, Billy Reid) – 3:19
"Satin Doll" (Duke Ellington, Johnny Mercer, Billy Strayhorn) – 7:01

Personnel

Musicians
Jimmy Smith – organ
Kenny Burrell – guitar
Grady Tate – drums

Technical
 Creed Taylor – producer
 Rudy Van Gelder – engineer
 Val Valentin – director of engineering
 Chuck Stewart – photography
 Holmes Daddy-O Daylie – liner notes

Chart performance

Album

Single

References

1965 albums
Jimmy Smith (musician) albums
Verve Records albums